The 2018 Allsvenskan, part of the 2018 Swedish football season, was the 94th season of Allsvenskan since its establishment in 1924. A total of 16 teams participated. As the 2018 FIFA World Cup will start on 14 June, the last round before stoppage will be held on 27 May. The league will resume games on 7 July.

Malmö FF were the defending champions after winning the title in the previous season. AIK won the Swedish championship this season, their sixth Allsvenskan title and 12th Swedish championship overall, in the 30th round on 11 November when they won 0–1 in the away fixture against Kalmar FF at Guldfågeln Arena.

Summary

Teams

A total of sixteen teams are contesting the league, including thirteen sides from the previous season, two promoted teams from the 2017 Superettan and one team from the 2017 Allsvenskan play-offs.

Halmstads BK and AFC Eskilstuna were relegated at the end of the 2017 season after finishing in the bottom two places of the table. They were replaced by 2017 Superettan champions IF Brommapojkarna and runners-up Dalkurd FF. IF Brommapojkarna returned to Allsvenskan after three years' absence, having been relegated at the end of the 2014 season. This is IF Brommapojkarna's sixth season in the league. Dalkurd FF are participating in the league for the first time in the club's history; they are the fourth new club in the last five Allsvenskan seasons (following Falkenbergs FF in 2014, Östersunds FK in 2016 and AFC Eskilstuna in 2017).

The final spot was taken by the 2017 Allsvenskan play-offs winner; Trelleborgs FF, third-placed team in 2017 Superettan, who replace Jönköpings Södra IF.

Stadia and locations

 1 According to each club information page at the Swedish Football Association website for Allsvenskan.

Personnel and sponsoring
All teams are obligated to have the logo of the league sponsor Svenska Spel as well as the Allsvenskan logo on the right sleeve of their shirt.

Note: Flags indicate national team as has been defined under FIFA eligibility rules. Players and Managers may hold more than one non-FIFA nationality.

Managerial changes

League table

Positions by round

Results

Play-offs
The 14th-placed team of Allsvenskan meets the third-placed team from 2018 Superettan in a two-legged tie on a home-and-away basis with the team from Allsvenskan finishing at home.

2–2 on aggregate. AFC Eskilstuna won on away goals.

Season statistics

Top scorers

Hat-tricks

Top assists

Monthly awards

Annual awards

See also

Competitions
 2018 Superettan
 2018 Division 1
 2017–18 Svenska Cupen
 2018–19 Svenska Cupen

Team seasons
 2018 AIK Fotboll season
 2018 Djurgårdens IF season
 2018 Hammarby Fotboll season
 2018 Malmö FF season

References

External links
 

2018
1
Sweden
Sweden